The International Workshop on OpenCL (IWOCL – "eye-wok-ul") is an annual conference that brings together the community of OpenCL users, researchers, developers and suppliers to share OpenCL best practices and help advance the use of the Khronos OpenCL standard for the parallel programming of heterogeneous systems.

Participation at IWOCL is open to anyone who is interested in contributing to, and participating in the OpenCL community including developers working with the many APIs, tools and libraries built on OpenCL, including the Khronos SPIR (Standard Portable Intermediate Representation) and SYCL (C++ abstraction layer).

Technical program and submissions
A Call for Sessions usually goes out in the Autumn before the event the following May. 

The technical program comprises research papers (published in the ACM Conference Series), technical presentations and posters, preceded by a day of workshops.  All submissions are reviewed by a Technical Committee comprising world-leaders in the field of OpenCL and Heterogeneous computing.

Event History and Dates
The International Workshop on OpenCL (IWOCL) is now in its 10th year with the first event taking place at Georgia Tech, USA on May 13–14, 2013

Event organization
IWOCL is a community led, not-for profit event chaired by Simon McIntosh-Smith, Professor in High Performance Computing and Head of the Microelectronics Group at Bristol University.

References

External links

 IWOCL Official Site
 Official site for the Khronos OpenCL Standard

GPGPU
Technology conferences
Trade fairs in the United Kingdom